The Kashubian Association is a Poland-based association for Kashubians with the aim of developing the national, civic and cultural awareness of Kashubians from around the world. In particular, it is calling for recognizing the Kashubian as an ethnic minority in Poland: in the current Polish law on minorities, the only right the Kashubians enjoy is the status of their language as regional.

History of organisation 
The Kashubian Association was founded on August 12, 2011, by people previously associated with the magazines  and Òdroda (Kaszëbskô Òdroda), the Nasze Kaszuby internet portal (formerly 'Kashubian-Pomeranian Resources'), the literary group ZYMK (Zéńdzenié Młodëch Ùtwórców Kaszëbsczich; Polish: Spotkanie Młodych Autorów Kaszubskich: English: Conference of Young Kashubian Authors) and the Kashubian-Pomeranian Association.

Objectives 
The Statute of the organization declares the following goals:
 Lobby for a change in the law on minorities, so that Kashubs acquire ethnic minority status.
 Resurgence and establishment of the national consciousness of Kashubians.
 Revival of Kashubian culture.
 Promoting knowledge about Kashubians.
 Protecting the ethnic rights of people declaring Kashubian nationality.
 Shaping and developing active attitude among the young generation of Kashubians, fostering the creation of governance and a sense of full responsibility for their homeland.

Minority status 
The association seeks consolidation of the Kashubian national movement and asserts that ethnic minority status is necessary to increase the protection and development of the Kashubian culture. The president of the Kashubian-Pomeranian Association, disagrees that ethnic minority status is necessary or desirable.

References

External links
KJ official site

Kashubians
Pomerania
Polish regional societies
Political parties of minorities in Poland